The Grzegorczyk hierarchy, named after the Polish logician Andrzej Grzegorczyk, is a hierarchy of functions used in computability theory. Every function in the Grzegorczyk hierarchy is a primitive recursive function, and every primitive recursive function appears in the hierarchy at some level. The hierarchy deals with the rate at which the values of the functions grow; intuitively, functions in lower levels of the hierarchy grow slower than functions in the higher levels.

Definition 

First we introduce an infinite set of functions, denoted Ei for some natural number i. I.e., E0 is the addition function, and E1 is a unary function which squares its argument and adds two. Then, for each n greater than 2, we define , i.e. the x-th iterate of  evaluated at 2.

From these functions we define the Grzegorczyk hierarchy. , the n-th set in the hierarchy, contains the following functions:
 Ek for k < n
 the zero function (Z(x) = 0);
 the successor function (S(x) = x + 1);
 the projection functions;

In other words,  is the closure of set  with respect to function composition and limited recursion (as defined above).

Properties 

These sets clearly form the hierarchy

They are strict subsets. In other words

 includes functions such as x+1, x+2, ... 
 provides all addition functions, such as x+y, 4x, ...
 provides all multiplication functions, such as xy, x4 
 provides all exponentiation functions, such as xy, 222x, and is exactly the elementary recursive functions.
 provides all tetration functions, and so on.

Notably, both the function  and the characteristic function of the predicate  from the Kleene normal form theorem are definable in a way such that they lie at level  of the Grzegorczyk hierarchy. This implies in particular that every recursively enumerable set is enumerable by some -function.

Relation to primitive recursive functions 

Thus the Grzegorczyk hierarchy can be seen as a way to limit the power of primitive recursion to different levels.

It is clear from this fact that all functions in any level of the Grzegorczyk hierarchy are primitive recursive functions (i.e. ) and thus:

It can also be shown that all primitive recursive functions are in some level of the hierarchy, thus

and the sets  partition the set of primitive recursive functions, .

Extensions 

The Grzegorczyk hierarchy can be extended to transfinite ordinals. Such extensions define a fast-growing hierarchy. To do this, the generating functions  must be recursively defined for limit ordinals (note they have already been recursively defined for successor ordinals by the relation ). However, this definition depends upon a standard way of defining the fundamental sequence.  suggests a standard way for all ordinals α < ε0.

The original extension was due to Martin Löb and Stan S. Wainer and is sometimes called the Löb–Wainer hierarchy.

See also 
 ELEMENTARY
 Fast-growing hierarchy
 Ordinal analysis

Notes

References

Bibliography 

Computability theory
Hierarchy of functions